The Chicony Electronics Headquarters is a skyscraper office building located in Sanchong District, New Taipei, Taiwan. As of February 2021, it is the fifteenth tallest building in Taiwan and the third tallest in New Taipei City (after Far Eastern Mega Tower and Neo Sky Dome).

See also 
 List of tallest buildings in Taiwan
 List of tallest buildings in New Taipei City

References

Skyscraper office buildings in New Taipei
Office buildings completed in 2014
2014 establishments in Taiwan